The ALCO HH series were an early series of switcher diesel-electric locomotives built by the American Locomotive Company (ALCO) of Schenectady, New York between 1931 and 1940, when they were replaced by the S series; the  S-1 and  S-2.  They were ALCO's first diesel switchers to enter true series production, and among the first land vehicles anywhere to use the revolutionary diesel-electric power transmission.

The "HH" name stood for "High Hood", a name ALCO came eventually to use in an official context, but originally an unofficial name.  Model designations such as HH600 are only semi-official.  Original ALCO designations were either descriptive or based on the internal order/design number.

A total of 177 of the HH series were produced; this comprised one prototype and four production models of varying power outputs.

ALCO 600 (New Haven #0900)
The first HH series locomotive, ALCO demonstrator #600 was mechanically almost identical to the others, but the appearance differed.  The sides of the locomotive's hood sloped outward from top to bottom, and brake equipment was exposed beneath the cab.  After a period of demonstration on a number of railroads, the unit was sold to the New York, New Haven and Hartford Railroad who numbered it as 0900, this number often being used to describe the locomotive, although the classification on the builder's data card was "404-OE-200".  It rode on a unique pattern of trucks.  This first unit was built in July 1931.

Diesel-electric power transmission 
The locomotive was equipped with a four-stroke McIntosh & Seymour 531 straight-6 diesel engine, powering a General Electric GT551A1 main generator.  Four nose-suspended GE-287-D traction motors in the trucks were geared at a ratio of 4.25:1 to the wheels; the motors were cooled by electrically driven traction motor blowers.

HH600
The HH600 was nearly identical to the previous #0900 of the New Haven internally and mechanically, but it was clad in new bodywork, with a straight-sided hood and cab sides that came all the way to the frame. The first-built units had sharp-edged front hood corners, but in 1934 ALCO employed industrial designer Otto Kuhler to clean up the appearance; he curved the corners and recessed the headlight, and all subsequent HH series units were of this style until another restyling in 1938 where the nose was further rounded. Late versions of this locomotive used the 6-cylinder 538 engine.

Original buyers

HH900
The HH900 was a 900 hp (670 kW) version of the HH series using a turbocharged version of the McIntosh & Seymour 531 engine.  Both turbocharged models (HH900 and HH1000) needed a greater cooling capacity, and this was reflected in the larger bodyside radiator space of both models, which distinguishes them from the lower-powered HH600 and HH660.  The 21 HH900 units were produced between March 1937 and January 1939, after which it was replaced by the McIntosh & Seymour 538T-engined HH1000. Several HH900s were built with the 538T engine.

Original buyers

HH660
The HH660 started production in ALCO's lineup in October 1938; 43 examples were built until April 1940.  It used a naturally aspirated version of the 6-cylinder McIntosh and Seymour 538 engine, producing .  Externally, HH660s are indistinguishable from late HH600s.

Original buyers

HH1000
The HH1000 replaced the HH900, replacing the 531 engine with the new McIntosh and Seymour 538T engine, turbocharged to produce 1000 hp (750 kW), a 100 hp (75 kW) increase on the previous model.  It was produced during May 1939 and December 1940; 34 were built.
M&STL D539 was the only HH1000 built with the 531T engine.

Original buyers

Specifications

Surviving units
A few HH series switchers still survive in revenue service, and more are in museums.  Working HH locomotives include an HH660 at Gopher Scrap in Mankato, Minnesota, one more owned by the Western New York Railway Historical Society, and one on the Delaware-Lackawanna Railroad owned by Genesee Valley Transportation Company at Scranton, Pennsylvania.  Preserved locomotives include an HH600, four HH660s, an HH900 and an HH1000.

Birmingham Southern #82, the sole surviving ALCO HH900, is on static display at the Heart of Dixie Railroad Museum in Calera, Alabama.

See also 
 List of ALCO diesel locomotives

Notes

References
 
 Sweetland, David. (2004) Santa Fe's Alco Switcher Fleet.  Diesel Era Vol. 15 No. 6, November/December 2004, pp. 10–31.  Withers Publishing, Halifax, Pennsylvania.
 Laundry, Mark.  Alco High Hood Models. Retrieved March 29, 2005.
 Komaneski, John. ALCO HH600 Roster.  Retrieved March 27, 2005.  States information originally from Extra 2200 South.
 Komaneski, John. ALCO HH660 Roster.  Retrieved March 27, 2005.  States information originally from Extra 2200 South.
 Komaneski, John. ALCO HH900 and HH1000 Roster.  Retrieved March 27, 2005.  States information originally from Extra 2200 South.
 Data sheets: HH-600 , HH-660 
 Steinbrenner, Richard (2003) The American Locomotive Company A Centennial Remembrance. Chapter VI subchapter "ALCO's First Production Diesels".

HH series
B-B locomotives
Diesel-electric locomotives of the United States
Standard gauge locomotives of the United States
Railway locomotives introduced in 1932